The ornate paradisefish (Malpulutta kretseri) or spotted gourami, is a species of gourami endemic to Sri Lanka. It is the only recognized species in its genus.

It inhabits shallow, slow-flowing streams in forested areas shaded with plentiful vegetation near the edges and a substrate covered by leaf litter. It is a carnivore, preying on plankton, fish fry, and the larvae of insects. This species can also occasionally be found in the aquarium trade, where it is reportedly exceedingly shy. The specific name of this fish honours the Sri Lankan lawyer and judge Oswald Leslie De Kretser II.

References

ornate paradisefish
Freshwater fish of Sri Lanka
Endemic fauna of Sri Lanka
ornate paradisefish
Taxa named by Paulus Edward Pieris Deraniyagala
Taxonomy articles created by Polbot